John Evelyn (born 16 October 1939) is a British bobsledder. He competed in the two-man and the four man events at the 1972 Winter Olympics.

References

1939 births
Living people
British male bobsledders
Olympic bobsledders of Great Britain
Bobsledders at the 1972 Winter Olympics
Sportspeople from Cheltenham